Gonzalezia is a genus of flowering plants belonging to the family Asteraceae.

Its native range is northern and western Mexico.

The genus name of Gonzalezia is in honour of María del Socorro González Elizondo (b. 1953), a Mexican plant taxonomist with a focus on Cyperaceae. It was first described and published in Bot. J. Linn. Soc. Vol.167 on page 326 in 2011.

Known species, according to Kew;
Gonzalezia decurrens 
Gonzalezia hypargyrea 
Gonzalezia rosei

References

Asteraceae
Asteraceae genera
Plants described in 2011
Flora of Mexico